Elections were held in Elgin County, Ontario on October 24, 2022 in conjunction with municipal elections across the province.

Elgin County Council
Elgin County Council consists of the mayors of the constituent municipalities plus the deputy mayors of Central Elgin and Malahide.

Aylmer
The following were the results for mayor of Aylmer.

Mayor

Bayham
The following were the results for mayor of Bayham.

Mayor

Central Elgin
The following were the results for mayor and deputy mayor of Central Elgin.

Mayor
Incumbent mayor Sally Martyn did not run for re-election. Running to replace her were Ward 2 councillor Dennis Creivits and deputy mayor Tom Marks.

Deputy mayor

Dutton/Dunwich
Incumbent mayor Bob Purcell did not run for re-election. Running to replace him were deputy mayor Mike Hentz and Phil Gibson.

Mayor

Malahide
The following were the results for mayor and deputy mayor of Malahide.

Mayor

Deputy mayor

Southwold
The following were the results for mayor of Southwold.

Mayor

West Elgin
Duncan McPhail was re-elected as mayor of West Elgin by acclamation.

References

Elgin
Elgin County